Natasha C. Merle (born 1983) is an American lawyer from New York who is a nominee to serve as a United States district judge of the United States District Court for the Eastern District of New York.

Education 

Merle received her Bachelor of Arts in government and Spanish, with honors, from the University of Texas at Austin in 2005 and she graduated, cum laude, with a Juris Doctor from the New York University School of Law in 2008.

Career 

Merle began her legal career as a law clerk for Judge Robert L. Carter of the United States District Court for the Southern District of New York from 2008 to 2009. From 2009 to 2011, she was a staff attorney at the Gulf Region Advocacy Center. Merle then became an assistant federal public defender at the Office of the Federal Public Defender. She also served as a law clerk for Judge John Gleeson of the United States District Court for the Eastern District of New York from 2012 to 2013.

From 2013 to 2015, Merle was a litigation associate and civil rights fellow at Fried, Frank, Harris, Shriver & Jacobson in New York City. From 2016 to 2021, she served as assistant counsel and then senior counsel for the NAACP Legal Defense and Educational Fund ("LDF"). Since 2021, she has been the deputy director of litigation at LDF.

Notable cases 

She was also a member of the petitioner team in Buck v. Davis in 2017.

As of January 2022, she was lead counsel for NAACP LDF v. Trump.

Nomination to district court 

On January 19, 2022, President Joe Biden nominated Merle to serve as a United States district judge of the United States District Court for the Eastern District of New York. President Biden nominated Merle to a new seat. On April 27, 2022, a hearing on her nomination was held before the Senate Judiciary Committee. On May 26, 2022, her nomination was reported out of committee by a 12–10 vote. On January 3, 2023, her nomination was returned to the President under Rule XXXI, Paragraph 6 of the United States Senate; she was renominated later the same day. On February 2, 2023, the committee deadlocked on her nomination by a 10–10 vote, which means that her nomination will be reconsidered. On February 9, 2023, her nomination was reported out of committee by an 11–10 vote. Her nomination is pending before the United States Senate.

References 

1983 births
Living people
21st-century American women lawyers
21st-century American lawyers
Place of birth missing (living people)
African-American women lawyers
African-American lawyers
New York University School of Law alumni
People associated with Fried, Frank, Harris, Shriver & Jacobson
People from Brunswick, Maine
Public defenders
University of Texas at Austin alumni